Kaad Ranching and Farming Company ( – Sherkat-e Dāmperūrī va Zerā‘ī-ye Kāād) is a village in Mohammadabad Rural District, Zarach District, Yazd County, Yazd Province, Iran. At the 2006 census, its population was 17, in 5 families.

References 

Populated places in Yazd County